Valya Dudycz Lupescu (also known as Valya Lupescu) is a Ukrainian American writer of magic realism and speculative fiction.

Background and personal life 
A second-generation Ukrainian American, Lupescu's writing reflects both her Ukrainian heritage and her American life. She holds an MFA in Writing from the School of the Art Institute of Chicago and a B.A. in English from DePaul University, Chicago. She has taught at DePaul University, Loyola University, and Columbia College in Chicago. Lupescu is the daughter of retired Illinois state senator Walter Dudycz. She is divorced and lives in Chicago, Illinois with her partner and writer, Stephen H. Segal and her three children.

Works 
Lupescu's debut novel,The Silence of Trees, was published in 2010 by Wolfsword Press and was selected as a semifinalist in the 2008 Amazon Breakthrough Novel Award. Lupescu co-wrote two books of nonfiction with partner Segal, Geek Parenting: What Joffrey, Jor-El, Maleficent, and the McFlys Teach Us About Raising a Family, published in 2016 by Quirk Books, and Forking Good: An Unofficial Cookbook for Fans of The Good Place, published in 2019 by Quirk Books. 

Lupescu's graphic novel, Mother Christmas Volume 1: The Muse is the first in a trilogy that "reimagines the origin story of Santa Claus, based on the Mediterranean legend of St. Nicholas." 

Lupescu's short story, "Honey" was selected for the Year's Best Dark Fantasy and Horror 2019, edited by Paula Guran. Lupescu's poems were included in the Ukrainian American Poets Respond Anthology, published by Yara Arts Group and Poets of Queens in response to the 2022 Russian Invasion of Ukraine. 

Lupescu is also the founding editor of Conclave: A Journal of Character and occasionally teaches workshops around Chicago and online. Lupescu founded and works creatively with artists, writers, and musicians who are members of the Coop: Chicago Creative Collaborative Salon.

Contributions to the Chicago Literary Hall of Fame 
Lupescu served on the board of directors for the Chicago Writers Association and was one of the founders of the Chicago Literary Hall of Fame. The Chicago Literary Hall of Fame had its inaugural Induction Ceremony on November 20, 2010, at Northeastern Illinois University. Lupescu was the Director of Event Planning for the event that inducted Saul Bellow, Gwendolyn Brooks, Richard Wright, Nelson Algren, Lorraine Hansberry, and Studs Terkel.

In 2012, Lupescu worked with Founder and Executive Director Don Evans of the Chicago Literary Hall of Fame to design a new award to honor living writers, the Fuller Award for Lifetime Achievement. The first writer to be honored with the Fuller Award was Gene Wolfe at a ceremony held on March 17, 2012, hosted by Gary K. Wolfe at the Sanfilippo Estate in Barrington Hills, IL. Among those who paid tribute to Wolfe were Neil Gaiman, Michael Swanwick, Audrey Niffeneger, and others.

Books
 The Silence of Trees (2010, Wolfsword Press, author)
 Mother Christmas Volume 1: The Muse (2022, Rosarium Publishing, author) 
 Forking Good: An Unofficial Cookbook for Fans of The Good Place (2019, Quick Books, co-author with Stephen H. Segal) 
 Geek Parenting: What Joffrey, Jor-El, Maleficent, and the McFlys Teach Us About Raising a Family (2016, Quick Books, co-author with Stephen H. Segal) 
 Conclave: A Journal of Character (2008, 2009–2010, editor) Various artists and authors with a focus on character-driven prose, poetry, and art.

See also
Lupescu
Magda Lupescu

References

External links

Valya Dudycz Lupescu Home Page
Books To Look For, The Magazine of Fantasy & Science Fiction review of The Silence of Trees by Charles de Lint
Book Review for The Nervous Breakdown by Kristin Thiel
Book Review for The Romance Reviews by Veronica Marie Beaumont
Interview on Between the Lines: Devoted to intelligent, opinionated booklovers and their bewildering array of idiosyncrasies by Kevin Nielson
The Fuller Award for Lifetime Achievement, given by the Chicago Literary Hall of Fame
History of Conclave: A Journal of Character
Coop: Chicago Creative Collaborative Salon
Chicago Literary Hall of Fame Website

Book Review for Palm Beach Post by Leslie Gray Streeter
Book Review for Foreword Reviews by Michelle Anne Schingler
Book Review for the Wall Street Journal by Keith Blanchard
Book Review for ICV2 by Brigid Alverson
Announcement of Guran’s Picks for Year’s Best Dark Fantasy & Horror 2019 on File770
Announcement of Ukrainian American Poets Respond book launch at DoNYC
Quirk Books Website, author page
Rosarium Publishing, author page
Review at Publishers Weekly  

1974 births
Living people
21st-century American novelists
American fantasy writers
American people of Ukrainian descent
American women novelists
Women science fiction and fantasy writers
Postmodern writers
DePaul University alumni
School of the Art Institute of Chicago alumni
21st-century American women writers
Writers from Chicago
Graphic novelists